Decadence – Prophecies of Cosmic Chaos is the sixth studio album by Swedish death metal band Centinex. It was released on 13 February 2004 Candlelight Records.

Track listing

Credits and personnel 
Centinex
Martin Schulman – bass
Jonas Kjellgren – guitar
Johan Jansson – vocals
Johan Ahlberg – guitar
Kennet Englund – drums

Guest musician
Mikael Danielsson – vocals (track 4)

Other staff
Jonas Kjellgren – mixing, mastering
Steve Beatty – executive producer
Edward Christie – executive producer
Per Gustafsson – cover art, layout
Eric Horval – artwork (vinyl), layout

References 

2004 albums
Centinex albums
Candlelight Records albums